Polyclinum is a genus of colonial sea squirts, tunicates in the family Polyclinidae.

Species
The World Register of Marine Species lists the following species:

Polyclinum arenosum (Sluiter, 1898)
Polyclinum aurantium Milne Edwards, 1841
Polyclinum cerebrale Michaelsen, 1924
Polyclinum circulatum Jensen, 1980
Polyclinum complanatum Herdman, 1899
Polyclinum constellatum Savigny, 1816
Polyclinum corbis Kott, 2003
Polyclinum crater Sluiter, 1909
Polyclinum festum Hartmeyer, 1905
Polyclinum fungosum Herdman, 1886
Polyclinum glabrum Sluiter, 1895
Polyclinum hesperium Savigny, 1816
Polyclinum hospitale Sluiter, 1909
Polyclinum incrustatum Michaelsen, 1930
Polyclinum indicum Sebastian, 1952
Polyclinum isiacum Savigny, 1816
Polyclinum isipingense Sluiter, 1898
Polyclinum johnsoni Monniot & Monniot, 1989
Polyclinum lagena Monniot & Monniot, 2006
Polyclinum laxum Van Name, 1945
Polyclinum macrophyllum Michaelsen, 1919
Polyclinum maeandrium Sluiter, 1915
Polyclinum marsupiale Kott, 1963
Polyclinum meridianum Sluiter, 1900
Polyclinum michaelseni Brewin, 1956
Polyclinum molle Rocha & Costa, 2005
Polyclinum neptunium Hartmeyer, 1912
Polyclinum novaezelandiae Brewin, 1958
Polyclinum nudum Kott, 1992
Polyclinum orbitum Kott, 1992
Polyclinum pedicellatum Monniot, 2012
Polyclinum planum (Ritter & Forsyth, 1917)
Polyclinum psammiferum Hartmeyer, 1911
Polyclinum pute Monniot & Monniot, 1987
Polyclinum reticulatum Sluiter, 1915
Polyclinum sacceum Monniot & Monniot, 2006
Polyclinum saturnium Savigny, 1816
Polyclinum sebastiani Brunetti, 2007
Polyclinum sibiricum Redikorzev, 1907
Polyclinum sluiteri Brewin, 1956
Polyclinum sundaicum (Sluiter, 1909)
Polyclinum tenuatum Kott, 1992
Polyclinum terranum Kott, 1992
Polyclinum tingens Monniot, 2012
Polyclinum tsutsuii Tokioka, 1954
Polyclinum vasculosum Pizon, 1908

References

Enterogona
Tunicate genera